Satyendranath Sarma (1917 - 1999) was an Assamese writer, educationalist, research scholar, critic and historian. He presided over the Assam Sahitya Sabha venue of Titabor in 1975.

Biography

Birth 
Satyendranath Sarma was born in Jhanji, Sivasagar in 1917 to Golapchandra Sarma and Senehi Devi.

Education 
In 1934, he passed matriculation from Jhanji Higher Secondary School (than Jhanji High School). In 1936, he passed I.A. examination and in 1939, he passed B.A. examination from Cotton College. In 1941 he completed M.A. in Assamese from Calcutta University. In 1955, he achieved doctorate degree.

Contribution to Literature

References

Asom Sahitya Sabha Presidents
People from Assam
1917 births
1999 deaths